Joseph Christopher Ewart (1799 – 14 December 1868) was a British Liberal and Whig politician.

He was elected Whig MP for Liverpool at a by-election in 1855—caused by the succession of Henry Liddell to 2nd Baron Ravensworth—and held the seat until 1865 when he was defeated.

References

External links
 

Liberal Party (UK) MPs for English constituencies
Whig (British political party) MPs for English constituencies
UK MPs 1852–1857
UK MPs 1857–1859
UK MPs 1859–1865
1799 births
1868 deaths
Members of the Parliament of the United Kingdom for Liverpool